Sudha Productions  (Marathi:सुधा प्रॉडक्शन) is a film production company started by Anuya Mhaiskar in 2008.

The company's first production was the critically acclaimed film Sukhaant which was released in 2009. The film was directed by Sanjay Surkar. Sukhaant won several awards that year including the Maharashtra State Award for the "Best Social Film". The next production was the black comedy Tendulkar Out from 2013. Sudha Productions' third film is a situational comedy called Aandhali Koshimbir.

Producers
The company was founded by Anuya Mhaiskar, who has a degree as a Kathak dancer. Mhaiskar and her brother Sachin Awasthee are the company's producers.

Filmography

References

External links
 

Film production companies based in Mumbai
Indian companies established in 2008
2008 establishments in Maharashtra
Mass media companies established in 2008